The 1977 Atlanta mayoral election took place on October 4, 1977. Incumbent Mayor Maynard Jackson easily won a second term without the need for a runoff.

Results

Atlanta
1977
Atlanta, Georgia